Ivan Iliev (born 8 March 1985) is a Bulgarian judoka.

Achievements

External links
 
 

1985 births
Living people
Bulgarian male judoka
Bulgarian sambo practitioners
21st-century Bulgarian people